Edmund Hammond, 1st Baron Hammond  (25 June 1802 – 29 April 1890), was a British diplomat and civil servant. He was Permanent Under-Secretary of State for Foreign Affairs from 1854 to 1873.

Background
Hammond was the third son and youngest child of George Hammond, a diplomat and civil servant, and Margaret, daughter of Andrew Allen.

Political career
Hammond entered the Civil Service in 1823. He served as Permanent Under-Secretary of State for Foreign Affairs from 1854 to 1873, a post previously held by his father. He was sworn of the Privy Council in 1866 and elevated to the peerage as Baron Hammond, of Kirkella in the Town and County of the Town of Kingston-upon-Hull, in 1874. He was a regular contributor in the House of Lords between 1875 and 1880.

Family

Lord Hammond married Mary Frances, daughter of Major-General Lord Robert Kerr, in 1846. They had three daughters. Lady Hammond died in London on 14 June 1888, aged 72. Lord Hammond survived her by two years and died in April 1890, aged 87. The barony died with him as he had no sons. There is a marble bust of Lord Hammond by Henry Weekes at the Foreign Office, London.

Lord Hammond and his wife are buried at St John the Baptist's Church, Old Malden.

Arms

References

Work cited

External links

1802 births
1890 deaths
Barons in the Peerage of the United Kingdom
Members of the Privy Council of the United Kingdom
Peers of the United Kingdom created by Queen Victoria